The Zeppelin-Lindau CS.I was a German single-engined reconnaissance seaplane with a low-wing monoplane layout.

Development
In 1918, Claude Dornier, working at the time at the Zeppelin factory in Lindau, proposed a reconnaissance seaplane to replace the Hansa-Brandenburg W.29. During flight tests, it became clear that the power of the power plant was insufficient and the engine was replaced by an  Benz Bz.IIIbo water-cooled V-8 engine. Nonetheless, test flights were discontinued following the World War I armistice.

Design
The CS.I was a twin float all-metal seaplane with a monocoque fuselage, initially powered by a  Mercedes D.IIIa six-cylinder in-line water-cooled engine. Armament consisted of a fixed forward-firing, synchronised  LMG 08/15 Spandau machine gun and a flexibly mounted  Parabellum MG 14 machine-gun in the rear cockpit.

Specifications

References

Bibliography

CS.I
1910s German military reconnaissance aircraft
Low-wing aircraft
Single-engined tractor aircraft
Aircraft first flown in 1918